The Golden Globe for New Star of the Year – Actor was an award given by the Hollywood Foreign Press Association at their annual Golden Globe Awards.

History
The award was first introduced at the 6th Golden Globe Awards in 1948, where it was given to actor Richard Widmark for his performance in the 1947 film Kiss of Death. It was awarded as the Golden Globe Award for Most Promising Newcomer – Male until 1975. There were no awards in 1949, and between 1954 and 1965 there were multiple winners. From 1976 to 1979, the award was called Best Acting Debut in a Motion Picture – Male. From 1980 to 1983, the award was called New Star of the Year in a Motion Picture – Male. A male actor did not receive the Award in 1982. The final recipient of the award was actor Ben Kingsley for his performance as the title character in the 1982 film Gandhi. The category was discontinued following the 1983 ceremony.

List of recipients

See also
 Golden Globe Award for New Star of the Year – Actress

References

External links
 Golden Globes Award official website
 Golden Globes Event History – retro to 1944

Retired Golden Globe Awards
 
Awards for young actors